Hermann Schwörer (1 May 1922 – 24 November 2017) was a German politician. He served in the Bundestag between 1958 and 1994. From 1970 to 1979, Schwörer was a member of the European Parliament.

References 

1922 births
2017 deaths
Christian Democratic Union of Germany MEPs
Members of the Bundestag for Baden-Württemberg
Members of the Bundestag 1990–1994
Members of the Bundestag 1987–1990
Members of the Bundestag 1983–1987
Members of the Bundestag 1980–1983
Members of the Bundestag 1976–1980
Members of the Bundestag 1972–1976
Members of the Bundestag 1969–1972
Members of the Bundestag 1965–1969
Members of the Bundestag 1961–1965
Members of the Bundestag 1957–1961
Commanders Crosses of the Order of Merit of the Federal Republic of Germany
Recipients of the Order of Merit of Baden-Württemberg
Members of the Bundestag for the Christian Democratic Union of Germany